Penthesilea was an Amazonian queen in Greek mythology.

Penthesilea may also refer to:

 271 Penthesilea, a large main belt asteroid
 Penthesilea (Kleist), a tragedy by Heinrich von Kleist
 Penthesilea (opera), a one-act opera by Othmar Schoeck
 Penthesilea (moth), a genus of moths
 Penthesilea (fly), a genus of fly, now in the genus Criorhina
 Penthesilea Painter, a Greek vase painter